Vein stripping is a surgical procedure done under general or local anaesthetic to aid in the treatment of varicose veins and other manifestations of chronic venous disease. The vein "stripped" (pulled out from under the skin using minimal incisions) is usually the great saphenous vein. The surgery involves making incisions (usually the groin and medial thigh), followed by insertion of a special metal or plastic wire into the vein. The vein is attached to the wire and then pulled out from the body. The incisions are stitched up and pressure dressings are often applied to the area.

An overnight hospital stay is sometimes required, although some clinics may do it as a day surgery procedure. Patients may be advised to avoid physical activity for days or weeks. A pressure bandage, followed by elastic stockings, is a common recovery prescription.


Complications
As with any surgery that requires anesthesia, patients might experience some complications.

Some risks include:
 Allergic reactions
 Post operative bleeding
 Deep vein thrombosis and pulmonary embolism
 Nerve injury leading to numbness or weakness in affected area
 Infection

See also
 Alternative procedures to vein stripping
 Medicine
 Surgery
 Anesthesia
 Perioperative mortality

References

Vascular surgical procedures